Serhiy Chapko (born 24 January 1988) is a Ukrainian former professional football midfielder who last played for Polish First League club Flota Świnoujście.

References

External links
Profile on Official FC Lviv Website

1988 births
Living people
Ukrainian footballers
FC Lviv players
FC Metalurh Donetsk players
FC Volyn Lutsk players
Association football midfielders